The Count of Monte Cristo is an adventure novel written by French author Alexandre Dumas (père) completed in 1844. It is one of the author's most popular works, along with The Three Musketeers.  Like many of his novels, it was expanded from plot outlines suggested by his collaborating ghostwriter Auguste Maquet.

The story takes place in France, Italy, and islands in the Mediterranean during the historical events of 1815–1839: the era of the Bourbon Restoration through the reign of Louis-Philippe of France. It begins on the day that Napoleon left his first island of exile, Elba, beginning the Hundred Days period when Napoleon returned to power. The historical setting is a fundamental element of the book, an adventure story centrally concerned with themes of hope, justice, vengeance, mercy, and forgiveness. It centers on a man who is wrongfully imprisoned, escapes from jail, acquires a fortune, and sets about exacting revenge on those responsible for his imprisonment.

Before he can marry his fiancée Mercédès, Edmond Dantès, a nineteen-year-old Frenchman, and first mate of the Pharaon, is falsely accused of treason, arrested, and imprisoned without trial in the Château d'If, a grim island fortress off Marseille. A fellow prisoner, Abbé Faria, correctly deduces that his jealous rival Fernand Mondego, envious crewmate Danglars, and double-dealing magistrate De Villefort turned him in. Faria inspires his escape and guides him to a fortune in treasure. As the powerful and mysterious Count of Monte Cristo (Italy), Dantès arrives from the Orient to enter the fashionable Parisian world of the 1830s and avenge himself on the men who conspired to destroy him.

The book is considered a literary classic today. According to Lucy Sante, "The Count of Monte Cristo has become a fixture of Western civilization's literature."

Plot

Marseille and Chateau d'If

On the day in 1815 when Napoleon escapes the Island of Elba, Edmond Dantès brings the ship Pharaon into dock at Marseille. His captain, Leclère, had died during the passage; the ship's owner, Morrel, will make Dantès the next captain. On his deathbed, Leclère charged Dantès to deliver a package to General Bertrand (exiled with Napoleon), and a letter from Elba to an unknown man in Paris. 

Dantès' colleague Danglars is jealous of Dantès' rapid promotion and, as the two men are at odds, fearful for his own employment should Dantès ascend. On the eve of Dantès' wedding to his Catalan fiancée Mercédès, Danglars meets at a cabaret with Fernand Mondego, Mercédès' cousin and a rival for her affections, and the two hatch a plot to anonymously denounce Dantès, falsely accusing him of being a Bonapartist traitor. Danglars and Mondego set a trap for Dantès. Dantès' neighbour, Caderousse, is present at the meeting; he too is jealous of Dantès, although he objects to the plot, but becomes too intoxicated with wine to prevent it. 

The following day at the wedding breakfast, Dantès is arrested, and the cowardly Caderousse stays silent, fearing being also accused of Bonapartism. Villefort, the deputy crown prosecutor in Marseille, destroys the letter from Elba when he discovers that it is addressed to his own father, Noirtier, a Bonapartist, knowing it would destroy his own political career. To silence Dantès, he condemns him without trial to life imprisonment and resists all appeals by Morrel to release him, during the Hundred Days and once the king Louis XVIII is restored to rule France.

After six years of solitary imprisonment in the Château d'If, Dantès is on the verge of suicide when he meets the Abbé Faria ("The Mad Priest"), a middle-aged Italian prisoner who had dug an escape tunnel that exited in Dantès' cell. Faria reveals he is a priest and scholar with excellent memory, creativity and impressive knowledge. Faria had been unfairly imprisoned back in 1807 after participating in political upheavals concerning the unification of Italy and then taken to the Château d'If in 1811. Faria says "(...) I dreamed of the very plan Napoleon tried to realise in 1811". At the time, Napoleon planned to set up a kingdom covering the whole Italian peninsula, notwithstanding, of course, opposition from the neighbouring kingdoms. (The so-called Risorgimento Italiano would not begin in earnest until at least 1848, and reached fulfillment until 1871.)

Over the next eight years, Faria educates Dantès in languages, history, culture, mathematics, chemistry, medicine, and science. Knowing himself to be close to death from catalepsy, Faria tells Dantès the location of a treasure on the Island of Monte Cristo, an inheritance from his work for the last of the Spada family, which, according to Faria himself, is estimated to be worth "Two Millions of Roman crowns [actually, écus, but it might as well refer to either soldi or denarii]; nearly thirteen millions of our money (francs)". During the course of his imprisonment, Faria tells the story of the treasure: Sometime in the late 1490s, Cardinal Cesare Spada was created a Cardinal after bribing the papal authorities. Pope Alexander VI had offered several nobleman such positions in the Roman Curia as part of a plan to systematically confiscate the corrupt cardinals wealth after killing them, through poisoning, often carried out during official dinners. After suspecting such intentions, the Cardinal Spada ordered his family  fortune to be hidden in the Island of Monte Cristo in order to prevent it from being seized by the Pope and his son Cesare Borgia. Before being killed, in a letter, he  informed his nephew and only heir  that the total of his fortune was hidden there and belonged to him through an invisible ink letter. However, Cardinal Spada's attempt failed, as neither Spada's nephew nor his descendants were able to decipher the note. When the Cardinal and his nephew attend a lunch presided over by the Pope, both die after drinking poisoned wine, leaving the treasure abandoned. 

Faria, who solved the mystery shortly after the death of the last living descendant of the Spada family, was on his way to retrieve the treasure but was captured by the Italian authorities, leaving him the only person who knew the secret.

On 28 February 1829, exactly 14 years after Edmond's imprisonment, Faria succumbs to catalepsy after his third attack. He became partly paralysed during the second, in which Dantés revived him by supplying him with a liquor. Taking advantage of the distraction of the jailers, Dantès, after failing to revive Faria, decides to take his body to his jail and takes his place in the burial sack, armed with a knife that Faria made. When he is thrown into the sea, Dantès cuts through the sack and swims to a nearby island, the Island of Tiboulen, where he is rescued by a Genoese smuggling ship that passes Monte Cristo called Jeune-Amélie (Young Amelia), whose crew allow Dantès to join them. After a few months (April–May 1829), during which time Dantès transforms his appearance and gets stable work aboard ship, he decides to seek out the treasure. Seizing an opportunity, Dantès and the crew disembark, with the excuse of hunting goats ("kids"). To stay on the island (to find his hidden treasure), Dantès simulates an accident and pretends he has broken some of his ribs. Six days later, the ship returns and he boards, carrying a few carefully hidden diamonds with him.

In port, Dantès sells some of the diamonds in order to purchase a yacht, sails to Monte Cristo for the rest of the treasure, and returns to Marseille in search of information which may lead to his vengeance. He later purchases the Island of Monte Cristo and the title of Count from the Tuscan government.

Travelling as the Abbé Busoni, Dantès meets Caderousse, now married and living in poverty, who regrets not intervening in Dantès' arrest. Caderousse informs Dantès that Mercédès had resigned herself, after eighteen months of vain expectations concerning Dantès' return from prison, to marrying Fernand, with whom she has a son, Albert.

Caderousse names Danglars and Mondego as the men who betrayed him, and also that his father has died of self-inflicted starvation. After Dantès' disappearance, both Danglars and Mondego had become successful beyond expectation; Danglars, after having been appointed as a cashier in a Spanish Bank—for which Mr. Morrel had recommended him—enters into the world of speculation, amassing a multi-million franc fortune and marrying Mr. de Salvieux's daughter, Madame de Norgonne, a wealthy widow. 

Mondego pursues a successful military career, especially after the restoration period, serving in the Battle of Ligny. After his service in the French Army, he eventually gains the favour of the restored Bourbon monarchy and ascends with rapidity in the Armée, becoming captain in 1823. He then travels to several campaigns both in Spain and in Greece, ascending to colonel and then lieutenant-colonel in 1829. Mondego and his wife finally remain in Spain due to his duties. 

After relating the story, Dantès rewards Caderousse a diamond, allegedly worth 50,000 francs (€ in ) that can be either a chance to redeem himself or a trap that will lead to his ruin.

Learning that his old employer Morrel faces bankruptcy, Dantès, posing as a clerk of Thomson and French, buys Morrel's debts and gives Morrel three months to fulfil his obligations. At the end of the three months and with no way to repay his debts, Morrel is about to commit suicide when he learns that his debts have been mysteriously paid and that one of his lost ships has returned with a full cargo, secretly rebuilt and laden by Dantès.

Revenge

After travelling in the East to continue his education (and to plot his revenge), Dantès reappears nine years later, in 1838, as the wealthy Count of Monte Cristo, a title he has purchased. His three targets are Mondego (now Count de Morcerf and husband of Mercédès); Danglars (now a baron and a banker); and Villefort (now procureur du roi, or prosecutor for the king).

In Rome, at Carnival time, Dantès arranges for Viscount Albert de Morcerf, the son of Mercédès and Mondego, to be captured by the bandit Luigi Vampa. Dantès "rescues" the boy, who shows his gratitude by agreeing to introduce the Count into Parisian society. In Paris, Dantès dazzles Danglars with his wealth, persuading him to extend him a credit of six million francs (approximately € in ). By manipulating the bond market, Dantès then quickly destroys a large portion of Danglars' fortune. The rest of it rapidly disappears through mysterious bankruptcies, suspensions of payment, and more bad luck in the Stock Exchange.

On 21 May 1838, during Dantès' first visit to Paris after a long while (though his alter-ego feigns he has never been there), he decides to stay at Albert's residence (next to his parents, the count and countess of Moncerf). He meets Mercédès for the first time in 23 years, without her knowing his real identity. After spending the time in the Moncerfs' residence, Dantès meets up with a notary in the Champs-Élysées to settle up the purchase of a private home located in Auteuil. Having paid the sum of 55,000 francs (€ in ) and after receiving the deed of the property and the keys, they both proceed to the residence. Upon arriving, after having become acquainted with the concierge and then exploring the house, Dantès' servant, a Corsican called Bertuccio, becomes nervous and uncomfortable. Dantès inquires after the reason for his uneasiness, threatening him unless he explains.

Bertuccio reveals he had an older brother who had raised him since they became orphans. Shortly after Bertuccio's brother married, he was ambushed and killed (possibly by radical royalists for being a Bonapartist) in 1815, shortly after Bonaparte's fall after the Hundred Days), in Nîmes, where Villefort ruled. His brother's death left him and his brother's widow, Assunta, without a living, which forces Bertuccio to take up smuggling. In July 1815 Bertuccio encounters Villefort, demanding he intervene and prosecute the killers, but he refuses to do so, stating that "Well, he was smitten with the sword, and he perished by the sword (...) It is a misfortune, and the government owes nothing to your family". Feeling cheated and deceived, Bertuccio warns Villefort "(...) protect yourself as well as you can, for the next time we meet your last hour has come". Concerned about his safety, Villefort asks to be transferred, eventually ending up in Versailles.

Bertuccio spends three months tracking Villefort to Auteuil, eventually finding him in late September 1815, the day when Madame Danglars, then a widow, delivered their illegitimate child in the house that the Count has now purchased from the father-in-law of Villefort, the Marquis de Saint-Meran. To cover up the affair, Villefort told Madame Danglars that the infant was stillborn, smothered the child and attempted to bury him in a box with a piece of linen cloth—which revealed his noble precedence—(inscribed with the letters "H" and "N", later revealed as indicating Hermine of Norgonne) in the garden. During the secret burial, Bertuccio stabs Villefort in the breast, which leaves him on the verge of death. Bertuccio unearths the child and resuscitates him after escaping from the residence. Unable to keep the child, given his current financial situation, he decides to leave the child at an asylum located in Paris. During the succeeding months, increased smuggling trade improves both Bertuccio and Assunta's fortunes.

Villefort later reveals that, after having been left in an agonizing state, he managed to creep back to the main house and reached the ladder where Madame Danglars—who had just gone through childbirth—found and rescued him. After being assisted by the delivery nurse—to whom Villefort and Danglars lied, attributing the wound to a duel—Villefort travelled to Versailles to recover from his wound. After three months of recovery, Villefort is ordered to the South to take upon his affairs, and, after travelling through the Central Paris, Chalons, the Rhone, Arles and Marseilles, at the end of six months (c. March–April 1816), Villefort heals definitely. Sometime later (on Villefort's account, November 1816), Villefort goes back to the Auteuil house in search of the corpse, for he was haunted by the feeling that the baby—as he was unable to find the box—may have survived and, if so, then Bertuccio (whom he doesn't know anything about, except for the fact that he was a Corsican) had kidnapped the baby after stabbing him.

Villefort tracked the baby to the same asylum where Bertuccio left him, but when arriving he was told that a woman (Assunta) in possession of half of the linen cloth had taken the baby away. According to Villefort, his agents lost track of her shortly after she left Chalons. Despite spending more than twenty years on that quest, by the time Villefort confessed the truth to Madame Danglars, his search had proven—at least, until then—completely unfruitful.

After the assassination attempt of Villefort, Bertuccio and Assunta travel back to Rogliano, Corsica, where Bertuccio returns to smuggling. Assunta tracks down the baby's location following the address stated in the linen cloth Bertuccio retrieved from the burial box and takes him home (he gave half of the cloth to Assunta). Assunta then decides to bring up the child, giving him the name "Benedetto" (meaning blessed in Italian). 

Benedetto, however, begins to engage in criminal activities from an early age, partly caused by Assunta's tolerant treatment of him, and takes up a life of crime by age 11. One day, after being refused money by Assunta, Benedetto and two comrades torture Assunta by exposing her feet close to the brazier, which causes her to burst into flames. Despite screaming in agony and trying to escape, she dies from her wounds.

At the same time, on 3 June 1829, during a journey to the Gulf of Lyon for business affairs, Bertuccio's ship is surrounded—due to increased surveillance—and he is forced to escape by swimming through the Rhône, finally reaching Beaucaire. There, on the road from Beaucaire to Bellegarde, he decides to make a stop at Caderousse's lodging to shelter. However, seeing that he had visitors inside, prefers to hide outside of the house, crossing the fence and hiding in a shed parallel to the inn.

Inside, Bertuccio sees Caderousse negotiating and discussing with a Parisian jeweller, M. Joannes, for the sale of the diamond bestowed by Dantès during his visit as the Abbé Busoni. The jeweller offers Caderousse a sum of 40, and then 45,000 francs for the diamond, but Carderouse demands to be paid the sum estimated by the Abbé (50,000 francs), which the jeweller rejects, not only telling him that he will not buy it for that price, but also threatening to report him to the authorities if he refuses to sell it to him at the price he requested, for the story of its acquisition sounds highly unlikely. Finally, Carderousse accepts the offer and receives 15,000 in gold and the remaining 30,000 in banknotes. 

When the jeweller is about to depart, Caderousse and his wife ask him to remain with the promise of supper and lodging for the night, an offer that the jeweller is finally forced to accept after a storm prevents him from returning to his home. After the Caderousses, Joannes and Bertuccio go to sleep, Caderousse, fueled by the impulse of greed, kills his wife and M. Joannes, then flees in the middle of the night with both the diamond and the 45,000 francs.

Bertuccio enters the house to view the crime scene but is discovered by the port authorities, who arrest him for the murders. After three months in jail, Bertuccio reveals the truth to the Abbé Busoni, who confirms his story. Shortly before 8 September, the day of his trial, Caderousse is captured in a neighbouring country and repatriated to France, where he confesses, which leads to Bertuccio's release from jail. Since his older brother and sister-in-law are now dead, Bertuccio has no family in Corsica, so he takes Abbé Busoni's advice to work for the Count.

Benedetto is sentenced to the galleys with Caderousse. After Benedetto and Caderousse are freed by Dantès, using the alias "Lord Wilmore," the Count induces Benedetto to take the identity of "Viscount Andrea Cavalcanti" and introduces him into Parisian society. Andrea ingratiates himself to Danglars, who betroths his daughter Eugénie to Andrea, not knowing they are half-siblings, after cancelling her engagement to Albert. Meanwhile, Caderousse blackmails Andrea, threatening to reveal his past if he does not share his newfound wealth. Cornered by "Abbé Busoni" while attempting to rob the Count's house, Caderousse begs to be given another chance. Dantès forces him to write a letter to Danglars exposing Cavalcanti as an impostor and allowing Caderousse to leave the house. The moment Caderousse leaves the estate, he is stabbed by Andrea. Caderousse dictates a deathbed statement identifying his killer, and the Count reveals his true identity to Caderousse moments before he dies.

Wanting information on how Albert's father made his fortune in Greece years earlier, Danglars researches the events, and the information is published in a French newspaper while Albert and the Count are in Normandy. Albert's friend Beauchamps sends the news article to Albert, who returns to Paris. His father has been tried in a court of the French aristocrats and is found guilty based on the testimony of Haydée, who reads the newspapers.

On an occasion at the Count's house, Albert meets Haydeé, who tells him the story of how she became a slave. After escaping from their palace, Ali Pasha of Janina, his wife, Vasiliki, his daughter, Haydeé, their servant Selim, and a troop of 20 soldiers escort Pasha's family to a fortress. His servants take the whole of Pasha's fortune stacked in 60,000 pouches—allegedly worth 25,000,000 francs in gold—and 200 barrels containing 30,000 pounds of powder to be set ready so, in case of not being pardoned by Sultan Mahmud II, they would, according to Pasha's own wishes, kill themselves in a murder-suicide. 

After hiding for some time, four boats reach Pasha's refuge. Pasha, who is cheated by Fernand, is received among cries of joy. Selim, who guarded the Pasha's fortune and his wife and daughter, is also deceived and persuaded to turn off the flame in his torch. After obeying this, Selim is seized and stabbed to death by four French soldiers. Ali, who resists being killed, exchanging gunfire with the Frenchmen, but is captured and murdered. After Ali's death, Fernand sold Ali's wife Vasiliki and his 4-year-old daughter Haydée into slavery, thus earning his fortune. While Vasiliki died thereafter, Dantès purchased Haydée seven years later when she was 13 years old.

After going to a trial, Fernand has a defence against the newspaper's story but no defence against Haydée's testimony. He rides away from the court in his disgrace. Albert blames the Count for his father's downfall, as Danglars says that the Count encouraged him to do the research on the father of the man engaged to his daughter. Albert challenges him to a duel. Mercédès, having already recognized Monte Cristo as Dantès, goes to the Count, now back in Paris, and begs him to spare her son. During this interview, she learns the truth of the arrest and imprisonment of Dantès but still convinces the Count not to kill her son. Realizing that Edmond Dantès now intends to let Albert kill him, she reveals the truth to Albert, which causes Albert to make a public apology to the Count. 

Albert and Mercédès disown Fernand and leave his house. Fernand then confronts the Count of Monte Cristo, who reveals his identity as Edmond Dantès; returning home in time to see his wife and son leave, Fernand shoots himself. Albert and Mercédès renounce their titles and wealth and depart to begin new lives, starting in Marseille, at the house where Dantès and his father once lived. Dantès told them of the 3,000 francs he had buried there, to start life once he married, before all his misfortunes. Albert enlists as a soldier.

Valentine, Villefort's daughter by his first wife, stands to inherit the fortune of her grandfather Noirtier and of her mother's parents, the Saint-Mérans, while Villefort's second wife Héloïse seeks the fortune for her son Édouard. The Count is aware of Héloïse's intentions and introduces her to the techniques of poison. Héloïse fatally poisons the Saint-Mérans, so that Valentine inherits their fortune. Valentine is briefly disinherited by Noirtier in an attempt to prevent Valentine's impending marriage with Franz d'Épinay, whom she does not love; however, the marriage is cancelled when d'Épinay learns from Noirtier that his father, who he believed was assassinated by Bonapartists, was killed by Noirtier in a duel. 

After a failed attempt on Noirtier's life, which leaves Noirtier's servant Barrois dead, Héloïse targets Valentine so that Édouard, his other grandchild, will get the fortune. However, Valentine is the prime suspect in her father's eyes in the deaths of the Saint-Mérans and Barrois. On learning that Morrel's son Maximilien is in love with Valentine, the Count saves her by making it appear as though Héloïse's plan to poison Valentine has succeeded and that Valentine is dead. Villefort learns from Noirtier that Héloïse is the real murderer and confronts her, giving her the choice of public execution or committing suicide.

Fleeing after Caderousse's letter exposes him and frees Danglars’ daughter from any marriage, Andrea is arrested and returned to Paris. Eugènie Danglars flees as well with her girlfriend. Villefort prosecutes Andrea. Bertuccio visits Andrea who is in prison awaiting trial, to tell him the truth about his father. At his trial, Andrea reveals that he is Villefort's son and was rescued after Villefort buried him alive. Villefort admits his guilt and flees the court. He rushes home to stop his wife's suicide but is too late; she is dead and has poisoned her son as well. The Count confronts Villefort, revealing his true identity as Dantès, which drives Villefort insane. Dantès tries but fails to resuscitate Édouard, causing him to question if he has gone too far.

Parallelly, the Count begins to manipulate the bond market. In Orléans, he visits a telegraph tower, in whose entrance he finds a 55-year-old man, who is fond of horticulture. After a brief acquaintance, the man, a public employee with a low-paying job. Up in the tower, the Count persuades him to allow him to manipulate the message, by bribing the telegrapher with 25,000 francs. The telegram sent to the Ministry of Interior states that the pretender to the throne King of Spain exiled at Bourges in 1830, Infante Carlos María Isidro of Spain, had returned to Barcelona acclaimed by popular opinion. This implied political instability, which would in turn impact negatively on the demand of Spanish bonds in which Danglars—according to his wife—had invested six million francs. However, after the news of the pretender's return was proved false, Danglars ends up losing 700,000 francs, and then, another 8–900,000 after a man called Jacopo Manfredi—secretly a Count's acquittance—mysteriously goes bankrupt—for Danglars always considered him creditworthy and "(...) he paid like a prince"—and fails to answer to his obligations.

Eventually, through further manipulation of the bond market, Danglars is left with a destroyed reputation and 5,000,000 francs he has been holding in deposit for hospitals. The Count demands this sum to fulfill their credit agreement, and Danglars embezzles the hospital fund. He abandoned his wife, whom he blames for his losses in stock investments. She is also abandoned by her partner in investing, whom she hoped to marry. Danglars flees to Italy with the Count's receipt for the cash he requested from the banker Danglars, and 50,000 francs. While leaving Rome, he is kidnapped by the Count's agent Luigi Vampa, a bandit, and is imprisoned. Forced to pay exorbitant prices for food—100,000 francs for a fowl and 25,000 for a bottle of water, for instance—and nearly starved to death, Danglars signs away his ill-gotten gains to survive. Dantès anonymously returns the money to the hospitals, as Danglars had given their cash to the Count. Danglars finally repents his crimes, and a softened Dantès forgives him and allows him to leave with his freedom and 50,000 francs.

Resolution and return to the Orient

Maximilien Morrel, believing Valentine to be dead, contemplates suicide after her funeral. Dantès reveals his true identity and explains that he rescued Morrel's father from bankruptcy years earlier; he then tells Maximilien to reconsider his suicide, and Maximilien is saved.

On the Island of Monte Cristo, Dantès presents Valentine to Maximilien and reveals the true sequence of events. Having found peace in reviewing his vengeance and deciding he cannot play God, Dantès leaves the newly reunited couple part of his fortune on the island and departs for the East to find comfort and begin a new life with Haydée, who has declared her love for him. The reader is left with a final thought: "l'humaine sagesse était tout entière dans ces deux mots: attendre et espérer!" ("all human wisdom is contained in these two words, 'Wait and Hope'").

Characters

Edmond Dantès and his aliases
 Edmond Dantès (born 1796): A sailor with good prospects, engaged to Mercédès. After his transformation into the Count of Monte Cristo, he reveals his true name to his enemies as each revenge is completed. During the course of the novel, he falls in love with Haydée.
 The Count of Monte Cristo: The identity Dantès assumes when he emerges from prison and acquires his vast fortune. As a result, the Count of Monte Cristo is usually associated with a coldness and bitterness that comes from an existence based solely on revenge. This character thinks of Lord Wilmore as a rival.
 Chief Clerk of the banking firm Thomson & French, an Englishman.
 Lord Wilmore: An Englishman, and the persona in which Dantès performs random acts of generosity.
 Sinbad the Sailor: The persona that Dantès assumes when he saves the Morrel family and assumes while mixing with smugglers and brigands.
 Abbé Busoni: The persona of an Italian priest with religious authority.
 Monsieur Zaccone: Dantès, in the guise of the Abbé Busoni, and again as Lord Wilmore, tells an investigator that this is the Count of Monte Cristo's true name.
 Number 34: The name given to him by the new governor of Château d'If. Finding it too tedious to learn Dantès' real name, he was called by the number of his cell.
 The Maltese Sailor: The name he was known by after his rescue by smugglers from the island of Tiboulen.

Allies of Dantès
 Abbé Faria: Italian priest and sage. Imprisoned in the Château d'If. Edmond's dearest friend and his mentor and teacher while in prison. On his deathbed, reveals to Edmond the secret treasure hidden on Monte Cristo. Partially based on the historical Abbé Faria.
 Giovanni Bertuccio: The Count of Monte Cristo's steward and very loyal servant. The Count first meets him in his role as Abbé Busoni, the confessor to Bertuccio, whose past is tied with M. de Villefort. Bertuccio's sister-in-law Assunta was the adoptive mother of Benedetto.
 Luigi Vampa: Celebrated Italian bandit and fugitive.
 Peppino: Formerly a shepherd, becomes a member of Vampa's gang. The Count arranges for his public execution in Rome to be commuted, causing him to be loyal to the Count.
 Ali: Monte Cristo's mute Nubian slave.
 Baptistin: Monte Cristo's valet-de-chambre.
 Jacopo: A poor smuggler who helps Dantès survive after he escapes prison. When Jacopo proves his selfless loyalty, Dantès rewards him with his own ship and crew. (Jacopo Manfredi is a separate character, the "bankrupt of Trieste", whose financial failure contributes to the depletion of Danglars' fortune.)
 Haydée (sometimes spelled as Haidee): Monte Cristo's young, beautiful slave. She is the daughter of Ali Tebelen. Buying her, enslaved because her father was killed, is part of Dantès' plan to get revenge on Fernand. At the end, she and Monte Cristo become lovers.

Morcerf family
 Mercédès Mondego (née Herrera): A Catalan girl, Edmond Dantès' fiancée at the beginning of the story. She later marries Fernand and they have a son named Albert. She is consumed with guilt over Edmond's disappearance and is able to recognize him when she meets him again. In the end, she returns to Marseilles, living in the house that belonged to father Dantès, given to her by Monte Cristo himself, praying for Albert, who left France for Africa as a soldier to start a new and more honorable life. She is portrayed as a compassionate, kind and caring woman who prefers to think of her beloved ones than of herself.
 Fernand Mondego: Count de Morcerf (former Catalan fisherman in the Spanish village near Marseilles), Dantès' rival and cousin of Mercédès, for whom he swore undying love and the person he eventually marries. Fernand helped frame Edmond (by sending the accusation letter) in an ultimate desperate attempt to not lose Mercédès forever. He would later achieve the high rank of general in the French army and become a peer of France in the Chambre des Pairs, keeping secret his betrayal of the Pasha Alì Tebelen and the selling into slavery of both his daughter Haydée and her mother Vasiliki. With the money earned he bought the title of "Count de Morcerf" to bring wealth and a more pleasant life for himself and his family. Through the book he shows a deep affection and care for his wife and son. He would meet his tragic end in the last chapters, by committing suicide, in the despair of having lost Mercédès and Albert, disowned by them when they discovered his hidden crimes.
 Albert de Morcerf: Son of Mercédès and Fernand. He is described as a very kind-hearted, joyful and carefree young man, and fond of Monte Cristo, whom he sees as a friend. After acknowledging the truth of his father's war crimes and the false accusation towards the sailor Edmond Dantès, he decides to leave his home with Mercédès and start a new life as a soldier under the name of "Herrera" (his mother's maiden name), leaving for Africa in search of fortune and to bring new honor to his family name.

Danglars family
 Baron Danglars: Dantès' jealous junior officer and mastermind behind his imprisonment, later a wealthy banker. He goes bankrupt and is left with only 50,000 francs after stealing 5,000,000 francs.
 Madame Hermine Danglars (formerly Baroness Hermine de Nargonne née de Servieux): Once a widow, she had an affair with Gérard de Villefort, a married man. They had an illegitimate son, Benedetto.
 Eugénie Danglars: Daughter of Baron Danglars and Hermine Danglars. She is free-spirited and aspires to become an independent artist.

Villefort family
 Gérard de Villefort: Chief deputy prosecutor who imprisons Dantès, later becoming acquaintances as Dantès exacts his revenge. He goes insane after his crimes are exposed.
 Renée de Villefort, Renée de Saint-Méran: Gérard de Villefort's first wife, mother of Valentine.
 The Marquis and Marquise de Saint-Méran: Renée's parents.
 Valentine de Villefort: The daughter of Gérard de Villefort and his first wife, Renée. In love with Maximilien Morrel. Engaged to Baron Franz d'Épinay. She is 19 years old with chestnut hair, dark blue eyes, and "long white hands".
 Monsieur Noirtier de Villefort: The father of Gérard de Villefort and grandfather of Valentine, Édouard (and, without knowing it, Benedetto). A committed anti-royalist. He is paralysed and only able to communicate with his eyes, but retains his mental faculties and acts as protector to Valentine.
 Héloïse de Villefort: The murderous second wife of Gérard de Villefort, mother of Édouard.
 Édouard de Villefort (Edward): The only legitimate son of Villefort.
 Benedetto: The illegitimate son of de Villefort and Baroness Hermine Danglars (Hermine de Nargonne), raised by Bertuccio and his sister-in-law, Assunta, in Rogliano. Becomes "Andrea Cavalcanti" in Paris.

Morrel family
 Pierre Morrel: Dantès' employer, owner of Morrel & Son.
 Maximilian Morrel: Son of Pierre Morrel, an army captain who becomes a friend of Dantès. In love with Valentine de Villefort.
 Julie Herbault: Daughter of Pierre Morrel, wife of Emmanuel Herbault.
 Emmanuel Herbault: An employee of Morrel & Son, who marries Julie Morrel and succeeds to the business.

Other characters
 Gaspard Caderousse: Originally a tailor and later the owner of an inn, he was a neighbour and friend of Dantès who fails to protect him at the beginning of the story. The Count first rewards Caderousse with a valuable diamond. Caderousse then turns to serious crimes of murder, spends time in prison, and ends up being murdered by Andrea Cavalcanti.
 Madeleine Caderousse, née Radelle: Wife of Caderousse, who, according to the court, is responsible for the murder of a Jewish jeweller. She also dies in the incident.
 Louis Dantès: Edmond Dantès' father, who dies from starvation during his son's imprisonment.
 Baron Franz d'Épinay: A friend of Albert de Morcerf, first fiancé of Valentine de Villefort. Originally, Dumas wrote part of the story, including the events in Rome and the return of Albert de Morcerf and Franz d'Épinay to Paris, in the first person from Franz d'Épinay's point of view.
 Lucien Debray: Secretary to the Minister of the Interior, a friend of Albert de Morcerf, and a lover of Madame Danglars, whom he provides with inside investment information, which she then passes on to her husband.
 Beauchamp: Journalist and Chief Editor of l’Impartial, and friend of Albert de Morcerf.
 Raoul, Baron de Château-Renaud: Member of a noble family and friend of Albert de Morcerf.
 Louise d'Armilly: Eugénie Danglars' music instructor and her intimate friend.
 Monsieur de Boville: Originally an inspector of prisons, later a detective in the Paris force, and still later the Receiver-General of the charities.
 Barrois: Old, trusted servant of Monsieur de Noirtier.
 Monsieur d'Avrigny: Family doctor treating the Villefort family.
 Major (also Marquis) Bartolomeo Cavalcanti: Old man who plays the role of Prince Andrea Cavalcanti's father.
 Ali Tebelen (Ali Tepelini in some versions): An Albanian nationalist leader, Pasha of Yanina, whom Fernand Mondego betrays, leading to Ali Pasha's murder at the hands of the Turks and the seizure of his kingdom. His wife Vasiliki and daughter Haydée are sold into slavery by Fernand.
 Countess Teresa Guiccioli: Her name is not actually stated in the novel. She is referred to as "Countess G—".

Themes

The historical setting is a fundamental element of the book, an adventure story primarily concerned with themes of hope, justice, vengeance, mercy, and forgiveness. It centers on a man who is wrongfully imprisoned, escapes from jail, acquires a fortune, and sets about exacting revenge on those responsible for his imprisonment.

Background to elements of the plot

A short novel titled Georges by Dumas was published in 1843, before The Count of Monte Cristo was written. This novel is of particular interest to scholars because Dumas reused many of the ideas and plot devices in The Count of Monte Cristo.

Dumas wrote that the germ of the idea of revenge as one theme in his novel The Count of Monte Cristo came from an anecdote (Le Diamant et la Vengeance) published in a memoir of incidents in France in 1838, written by an archivist of the Paris police. The archivist was Jacques Peuchet, and the multi-volume book was called Memoirs from the Archives of the Paris Police in English. Dumas included this essay in one of the editions of his novel published in 1846.

Peuchet related the tale of a shoemaker, Pierre Picaud, living in Nîmes in 1807, who was engaged to marry a rich woman when three jealous friends falsely accused him of being a spy on behalf of England in a period of wars between France and England. Picaud was placed under a form of house arrest in the Fenestrelle Fort, where he served as a servant to a rich Italian cleric. When the cleric died, he left his fortune to Picaud, whom he had begun to treat as a son. Picaud then spent years plotting his revenge on the three men who were responsible for his misfortune. He stabbed the first with a dagger on which the words "Number One" were printed, and then he poisoned the second. The third man's son he lured into crime and his daughter into prostitution, finally stabbing the man himself. This third man, named Loupian, had married Picaud's fiancée while Picaud was under arrest.

In another of the true stories reported by Ashton-Wolfe, Peuchet describes a poisoning in a family. This story is also mentioned in the Pléiade edition of this novel, and it probably served as a model for the chapter of the murders inside the Villefort family. The introduction to the Pléiade edition mentions other sources from real life:  a man named Abbé Faria existed, was imprisoned but did not die in prison; he died in 1819 and left no large legacy to anyone. As for Dantès, his fate is quite different from his model in Peuchet's book, since that model is murdered by the "Caderousse" of the plot.

Publication
The Count of Monte Cristo was originally published in the Journal des Débats in eighteen parts. Serialization ran from 28 August 1844 to 15 January 1846. The first edition in book form was published in Paris by Pétion in 18 volumes with the first two issued in 1844 and the remaining sixteen in 1845. Most of the Belgian pirated editions, the first Paris edition and many others up to the Lécrivain et Toubon illustrated edition of 1860 feature a misspelling of the title with "Christo" used instead of "Cristo". The first edition to feature the correct spelling was the L'Écho des Feuilletons illustrated edition, Paris 1846. This edition featured plates by Paul Gavarni and Tony Johannot and was said to be "revised" and "corrected", although only the chapter structure appears to have been altered with an additional chapter entitled La Maison des Allées de Meilhan having been created by splitting Le Départ into two.

English translations

The first appearance of The Count of Monte Cristo in English was the first part of a serialization by W. Francis Ainsworth in volume VII of Ainsworth's Magazine published in 1845, although this was an abridged summary of the first part of the novel only and was entitled The Prisoner of If. Ainsworth translated the remaining chapters of the novel, again in abridged form, and issued these in volumes VIII and IX of the magazine in 1845 and 1846 respectively. Another abridged serialization appeared in The London Journal between 1846 and 1847.

The first single volume translation in English was an abridged edition with woodcuts published by Geo Pierce in January 1846 entitled The Prisoner of If or The Revenge of Monte Christo.

In April 1846, volume three of the Parlour Novelist, Belfast, Ireland: Simms and M'Intyre, London: W S Orr and Company, featured the first part of an unabridged translation of the novel by Emma Hardy. The remaining two parts would be issued as the Count of Monte Christo volumes I and II in volumes 8 and 9 of the Parlour Novelist respectively.

The most common English translation is an anonymous one originally published in 1846 by Chapman and Hall. This was originally released in ten weekly installments from March 1846 with six pages of letterpress and two illustrations by M Valentin. The translation was released in book form with all twenty illustrations in two volumes in May 1846, a month after the release of the first part of the above-mentioned translation by Emma Hardy. The translation follows the revised French edition of 1846, with the correct spelling of "Cristo" and the extra chapter The House on the Allées de Meilhan.

Most English editions of the novel follow the anonymous translation. In 1889, two of the major American publishers Little Brown and T.Y. Crowell updated the translation, correcting mistakes and revising the text to reflect the original serialized version. This resulted in the removal of the chapter
The House on the Allées de Meilhan, with the text restored to the end of the chapter called The Departure.

In 1955, Collins published an updated version of the anonymous translation which cut several passages, including a whole chapter entitled The Past, and renamed others. This abridgment was republished by many Collins imprints and other publishers including the Modern Library, Vintage, and the 1998 Oxford World's Classics edition (later editions restored the text). In 2008 Oxford released a revised edition with translation by David Coward. The 2009 Everyman's Library edition reprints the original anonymous English translation that first appeared in 1846, with revisions by Peter Washington and an introduction by Umberto Eco.

In 1996, Penguin Classics published a new translation by Robin Buss. Buss' translation updated the language, making the text more accessible to modern readers, and restored content that was modified in the 1846 translation because of Victorian English social restrictions (for example, references to Eugénie's lesbian traits and behavior) to reflect Dumas' original version.

In addition to the above, there have also been many abridged translations such as an 1892 edition published by F.M. Lupton, translated by Henry L. Williams (this translation was also released by M.J. Ivers in 1892 with Williams using the pseudonym of Professor William Thiese). A more recent abridgment is the translation by Lowell Bair for Bantam Classics in 1956.

Many abridged translations omit the Count's enthusiasm for hashish. When serving a hashish jam to the young Frenchman Franz d'Épinay, the Count (calling himself Sinbad the Sailor), calls it, "nothing less than the ambrosia which Hebe served at the table of Jupiter". When he arrives in Paris, the Count brandishes an emerald box in which he carries small green pills compounded of hashish and opium which he uses for sleeplessness. (Source: Chapters 31, 32, 38, 40, 53 & 77 in the 117-chapter unabridged Pocket Books edition.) Dumas was a member of the Club des Hashischins.

In June 2017, Manga Classics, an imprint of UDON Entertainment, published The Count of Monte Cristo as a faithfully adapted Manga edition of the classic novel.

Japanese translations
The first Japanese translation by Kuroiwa Shūroku was entitled "Shigai Shiden Gankutsu-ou" (史外史伝巌窟王, "a historical story from outside history, the King of the Cavern"), and serialized from 1901 to 1902 in the Yorozu Chouhou newspaper, and released in book form in four volumes by publisher Aoki Suusandou in 1905. Though later translations use the title "Monte Cristo-haku" (モンテ・クリスト伯, the Count of Monte Cristo), the "Gankutsu-ou" title remains highly associated with the novel and is often used as an alternative. As of March 2016, all movie adaptations of the novel brought to Japan used the title "Gankutsu-ou", with the exception of the 2002 film, which has it as a subtitle (with the title itself simply being "Monte Cristo").

The novel is popular in Japan, and has spawned numerous adaptations, the most notable of which are the novels Meiji Gankutsu-ou by Taijirou Murasame and Shin Gankutsu-ou by Kaitarō Hasegawa. Its influence can also be seen in how one of the first prominent cases of miscarriage of justice in Japan, in which an innocent man was charged with murder and imprisoned for half a century, is known in Japanese as the "Yoshida Gankutsu-ou incident" (吉田岩窟王事件).

A manga adaptation of the novel, titled Monte Cristo Hakushaku (モンテ・クリスト, 伯爵) and made by Ena Moriyama, was published in November 2015.

Chinese translations
The first translation into Chinese was published in 1907. The novel had been a personal favorite of Jiang Qing, and the 1978 translation became one of the first mass-popularized foreign novels in mainland China after end of the Cultural Revolution. Since then, there have been another 22 Chinese translations.

Reception and legacy
The original work was published in serial form in the Journal des Débats in 1844. Carlos Javier Villafane Mercado described the effect in Europe:

George Saintsbury stated that "Monte Cristo is said to have been at its first appearance, and for some time subsequently, the most popular book in Europe. Perhaps no novel within a given number of years had so many readers and penetrated into so many different countries." This popularity has extended into modern times as well. The book was "translated into virtually all modern languages and has never been out of print in most of them. There have been at least twenty-nine motion pictures based on it ... as well as several television series, and many movies [have] worked the name 'Monte Cristo' into their titles." The title Monte Cristo lives on in a "famous gold mine, a line of luxury Cuban cigars, a sandwich, and any number of bars and casinos—it even lurks in the name of the street-corner hustle three-card monte."

Modern Russian writer and philologist Vadim Nikolayev determined The Count of Monte-Cristo as a megapolyphonic novel.

The novel has been the inspiration for many other books, from Lew Wallace's Ben-Hur (1880), then to a science fiction retelling in Alfred Bester's The Stars My Destination, and to Stephen Fry's The Stars' Tennis Balls (entitled Revenge in the U.S.).

Fantasy novelist Steven Brust's Khaavren Romances series have all used Dumas novels (particularly the Three Musketeers series) as their chief inspiration, recasting the plots of those novels to fit within Brust's established world of Dragaera. His 2020 novel The Baron of Magister Valley follows suit, using The Count of Monte Cristo as a starting point. Jin Yong has admitted some influence from Dumas, his favorite non-Chinese novelist. Some commentators feel that the plot of A Deadly Secret resembles The Count of Monte Cristo, except that they are based in different countries and historical periods.

Historical background

The success of The Count of Monte Cristo coincides with France's Second Empire. In the novel, Dumas tells of the 1815 return of Napoleon I, and alludes to contemporary events when the governor at the Château d'If is promoted to a position at the castle of Ham. The attitude of Dumas towards "bonapartisme" was conflicted. His father, Thomas-Alexandre Dumas, a Haitian of mixed descent, became a successful general during the French Revolution.  In 1840, the body of Napoleon I was brought to France and became an object of veneration in the church of Les Invalides, renewing popular patriotic support for the Bonaparte family. As the story opens, the character Dantès is not aware of the politics, considers himself simply a good French citizen, and is caught between the conflicting loyalties of the royalist Villefort during the Restoration, and the father of Villefort, Noirtier, loyal to Napoleon, a firm bonapartist, and the bonapartist loyalty of his late captain, in a period of rapid changes of government in France.

In "Causeries" (1860), Dumas published a short paper, "État civil du Comte de Monte-Cristo", on the genesis of the Count of Monte Cristo. It appears that Dumas had close contacts with members of the Bonaparte family while living in Florence in 1841. In a small boat, he sailed around the island of Monte Cristo, accompanied by a young prince, a cousin to Louis Bonaparte, who was to become Emperor Napoleon III of the French ten years later, in 1851. During this trip, he promised that cousin of Louis Bonaparte that he would write a novel with the island's name in the title. In 1841 when Dumas made his promise, Louis Bonaparte himself was imprisoned at the citadel of Ham – the place mentioned in the novel. Dumas did visit him there, although Dumas does not mention it in "Etat civil".

A chronology of The Count of Monte Cristo and Bonapartism
During the life of Thomas-Alexandre Dumas:
 1793: Thomas-Alexandre Dumas is promoted to the rank of general in the army of the First French Republic.
 1794: He disapproves of the revolutionary terror in Western France.
 1795–1797: He becomes famous and fights under Napoleon.
 1802: Black officers are dismissed from the army. The Empire re-establishes slavery.
 1802: Birth of his son, Alexandre Dumas père.
 1806: Thomas-Alexandre Dumas dies, still bitter about the injustice of the Empire.

During the life of Alexandre Dumas:
 1832: The only son of Napoleon I dies.
 1836: Alexandre Dumas is famous as a writer by this time (age 34).
 1836: First putsch by Louis Napoleon, aged 28, fails.
 1840: A law is passed to bring the ashes of Napoleon I to France.
 1840: Second putsch of Louis Napoleon. He is imprisoned for life and becomes known as the candidate for the imperial succession.
 1841: Dumas lives in Florence and becomes acquainted with King Jérôme and his son, Napoléon.
 1841–1844: The story is conceived and written.
 1844–1846: The story is published in parts in a Parisian magazine.
 1846: The novel is published in full and becomes a European bestseller.
 1846: Louis Napoleon escapes from his prison.
 1848: French Second Republic. Louis Napoleon is elected its first president but Dumas does not vote for him.
 1857: Dumas publishes État civil du Comte de Monte-Cristo

Selected notable adaptations

Film

 1908: The Count of Monte Cristo, a silent film starring Hobart Bosworth
 1913: The Count of Monte Cristo, a silent film starring James O'Neill
 1918: The Count of Monte Cristo, a silent-film serial starring Léon Mathot
 1922: Monte Cristo, starring John Gilbert and directed by Emmett J. Flynn
 1929: Monte Cristo, restored silent epic directed by Henri Fescourt
 1934: The Count of Monte Cristo, directed by Rowland V. Lee
 1940: The Son of Monte Cristo, directed by Rowland V. Lee
 1942: The Count of Monte Cristo (Spanish: El Conde de Montecristo), a Mexican film version, directed by Chano Urueta and starring Arturo de Córdova
 1946: The Return of Monte Cristo, directed by Henry Levin
 1950:  (أمير الانتقام), Egyptian film directed by Henry Barakat, starring Anwar Wagdi
 1953:The Count of Monte Cristo (Spanish: El Conde de Montecristo), directed by León Klimovsky and starring Jorge Mistral
 1954: The Count of Monte Cristo, starring Jean Marais
 1958: Vanjikottai Valiban (வஞ்சிக்கோட்டை வாலிபன்), Tamil film adaptation and its Hindi remake Raaj Tilak
 1961: Le comte de Monte Cristo, starring Louis Jourdan, directed by Claude Autant-Lara
 1964:  (أمير الدهاء), Egyptian film directed by Henry Barakat, starring Farid Shawqi
 1968: Sous le signe de Monte Cristo, French film starring Paul Barge, Claude Jade and Anny Duperey, directed by André Hunebelle, and set in 1947
 1975: The Count of Monte Cristo, TV film starring Richard Chamberlain, directed by David Greene
 1976:  (دائرة الانتقام), Egyptian film directed by Samir Seif, starring Nour El-Sherif
 1982: Padayottam, a Malayalam film adaption set in Kerala context, directed by Jijo Punnoose, starring Prem Nazir, Madhu, Mammootty and Mohanlal
 1986: Veta, Telugu film adaptation
 1986: Legacy of Rage, a Cantonese-language Hong Kong film adaptation, starring Brandon Lee
 1986: Asipatha Mamai, a Sinhala film adaptation
 1999: Forever Mine, film starring Joseph Fiennes, Ray Liotta and Gretchen Mol, loosely but clearly based upon The Count of Monte Cristo, directed/written by Paul Schrader
 2002: The Count of Monte Cristo, directed by Kevin Reynolds and starring Jim Caviezel, Dagmara Domińczyk, Richard Harris and Guy Pearce

Television
 1956: The Count of Monte Cristo, TV series based on further adventures of Edmond Dantès after the end of the novel
 1964: The Count of Monte Cristo, BBC television serial starring Alan Badel and Natasha Parry
 1966: Il conte di Montecristo, RAI Italian television serial directed by Edmo Fenoglio. starring Andrea Giordana
 1973: The Count of Monte Cristo UK/Italian animated series, produced by Halas and Batchelor and RAI Italy
 1977:  (大報復), Hong Kong television serial starring Adam Cheng, in which the background of the story is changed to Southern China during the Republican Era
 1979:  (日本巌窟王), Japanese television serial set in Edo period, starring Masao Kusakari
 1979: Le Comte de Monte-Cristo (1979 miniseries), French TV series starring Jacques Weber
 1984: La Dueña a 1984 Venezuelan telenovela with a female version of Edmond Dantès
 1988:  (litt. The Prisoner of Castle If ), Soviet miniseries starring Viktor Avilov (Count of Monte Cristo) and Aleksei Petrenko (Abbé Faria), with music and songs of Alexander Gradsky
 1994: Marimar, a Spanish language television series by Televisa that was an adaptation of The Count of Monte Cristo and later spawned remakes in Mexico and the Philippines.
 1998: The Count of Monte Cristo, television miniseries starring Gérard Depardieu
 2006: Montecristo, Argentine telenovela starring Pablo Echarri and Paola Krum
 2006: Vingança, telenovela directed by Rodrigo Riccó and Paulo Rosa, SIC Portugal
 2010: Ezel, a Turkish television series which is an adaptation of The Count of Monte Cristo
 2011: Un amore e una vendetta (English: Love and Vendetta) an Italian television series loosely based on the book
 2011: Revenge, a television series billed as an adaptation of The Count of Monte Cristo
 2012: Antsanoty, an Armenia-Armenian television series which is an adaptation of The Count of Monte Cristo
 2013: La Patrona, a loose Mexican remake of 1984 telenovela La Dueña
 2016: Goodbye Mr. Black, a South Korean TV series loosely based on The Count of Monte Cristo
 2016: Once Upon a Time's sixth season features the Count as a character, portrayed by Craig Horner. Several characters and plot elements from the story are also alluded to
 2016: Yago, Mexican telenovela starring Iván Sánchez and Gabriela de la Garza
 2018:  (モンテ・クリスト伯 –華麗なる復讐- Monte Kurisuto Haku: Kareinaru Fukushū), a Japanese TV series starring Dean Fujioka
 2018: Wes, a Sri Lankan-Sinhala television series that is an adaptation of The Count of Monte Cristo and was influenced by Ezel television series
2021: Miss Monte-Cristo, a South Korean adaptation on KBS featuring female characters.

Other appearances in film or television
 1973: The Count of Monte Cristo, animated short produced by Hanna-Barbera
 1994: The Shawshank Redemption when the prisoners are sorting out the donated books.
 2004: Gankutsuou: The Count of Monte Cristo (巌窟王　Gankutsuoo, literally "The King of the Cave"), Japanese animation adaptation. Produced by Gonzo, directed by Mahiro Maeda
 2007: The first section of The Simpsons episode, "Revenge Is a Dish Best Served Three Times" has an adaptation of The Count of Monte Cristo but it is entitled The Count of Monte Fatso
 Ithihaas seriel (1996–1997) made by Balaji productions for doordarshan channel in India was adapted from book Count of Monte Cristo

Sequels (books)
In 1853, a work professing to be the sequel of the book appeared, entitled The Hand of the Deceased appeared in Portuguese and French editions (respectively entitled A Mão do finado and La Main du défunt). The novel, falsely attributed to Dumas, but in fact, originally published anonymously or sometimes attributed to one F. Le Prince, has been traced to Portuguese writer .

Other sequels include:
 1881: The Son of Monte Cristo, Jules Lermina (1839–1915). This novel was divided in the English translation into two books: The Wife of Monte Cristo and The Son of Monte Cristo). Both were published in English in New York, 1884, translated by Jacob Ralph Abarbanell (1852–1922).
 1884: Edmond Dantès: The Sequel to Alexander Dumas' Celebrated Novel The Count of Monte Cristo, Edmund Flagg (1815–1890). Published in English by T.B. Peterson and Brothers in 1886 (no translator credited).
 1884: Monte-Cristo's Daughter: Sequel to Alexander Dumas' Great Novel, "The Count of Monte-Cristo," and Conclusion of "Edmond Dantès", Edmund Flagg. Published in English by T.B. Peterson and Brothers in 1886 (no translator credited).
 1885: The Treasure of Monte-Cristo, Jules Lermina (1839–1915).
 1869: The Countess of Monte Cristo, Jean Charles Du Boys (1836–1873). Published in English by T.B. Peterson and Brothers in 1871 (no translator credited).
 1887: Monte Cristo and his wife, presumably by Jacob Ralph Abarbanell.
 1902: Countess of Monte Cristo, by Jacob Ralph Abarbanell.
 2020: The Mummy of Monte Cristo, by J. Trevor Robinson. A horror-themed mashup novel.

Plays and musicals

Alexandre Dumas and Auguste Maquet wrote a set of four plays that collectively told the story of The Count of Monte Cristo: Monte Cristo Part I (1848); Monte Cristo Part II (1848); Le Comte de Morcerf (1851) and Villefort (1851). The first two plays were first performed at Dumas' own Théâtre Historique in February 1848, with the performance spread over two nights, each with a long duration (the first evening ran from 18:00 until 00:00). The play was also unsuccessfully performed at Drury Lane in London later that year where rioting erupted in protest against French companies performing in England.

The adaptation differs from the novel in many respects: several characters, such as Luigi Vampa, are excluded; whereas the novel includes many different plot threads that are brought together at the conclusion, the third and fourth plays deal only with the fate of Mondego and Villefort respectively (Danglars' fate is not featured at all); the play is the first to feature Dantès shouting "the world is mine!", an iconic line that would be used in many future adaptations.

Two English adaptations of the novel were published in 1868. The first, by Hailes Lacy, differs only slightly from Dumas' version with the main change being that Fernand Mondego is killed in a duel with the Count rather than committing suicide. Much more radical was the version by Charles Fechter, a notable French-Anglo actor. The play faithfully follows the first part of the novel, omits the Rome section and makes several sweeping changes to the third part, among the most significant being that Albert is actually the son of Dantès. The fates of the three main antagonists are also altered: Villefort, whose fate is dealt with quite early on in the play, kills himself after being foiled by the Count trying to kill Noirtier (Villefort's half brother in this version); Mondego kills himself after being confronted by Mercedes; Danglars is killed by the Count in a duel. The ending sees Dantès and Mercedes reunited and the character of Haydee is not featured at all. The play was first performed at the Adelphi in London in October 1868. The original duration was five hours, resulting in Fechter abridging the play, which, despite negative reviews, had a respectable sixteen-week run. Fechter moved to the United States in 1869 and Monte Cristo was chosen for the inaugural play at the opening of the Globe Theatre, Boston in 1870. Fechter last performed the role in 1878.

In 1883, John Stetson, manager of the Booth Theatre and The Globe Theatre, wanted to revive the play and asked James O'Neill (the father of playwright Eugene O'Neill) to perform the lead role. O'Neill, who had never seen Fechter perform, made the role his own and the play became a commercial, if not an artistic success. O'Neill made several abridgments to the play and eventually bought it from Stetson. A motion picture based on Fechter's play, with O'Neill in the title role, was released in 1913 but was not a huge success. O'Neill died in 1920, two years before a more successful motion picture, produced by Fox and partially based on Fechter's version, was released. O'Neill came to despise the role of Monte Cristo, which he performed more than 6000 times, feeling that his typecasting had prevented him from pursuing more artistically rewarding roles. This discontent later became a plot point in Eugene O'Neill's semi-autobiographical play Long Day's Journey Into Night.

In 2008, the Russian theatre of Moscow Operetta set a musical Monte-Cristo based on the book with music of Roman Ignatiev and lyrics of Yulii Kim. Six years later it won in Daegu International Musical Festival in South Korea. Original plot was slightly changed and some characters are not mentioned in the musical.

The Count of Monte Cristo is a musical based on the novel, with influences from the 2002 film adaptation of the book. The music is written by Frank Wildhorn and the lyrics and book are by Jack Murphy. It debuted in Switzerland in 2009.

Audio adaptations

 1938: The Mercury Theatre on the Air with Orson Welles (Dantés), Ray Collins (Abbé Faria), George Coulouris (Monsieur Morrel), Edgar Barrier (de Villefort), Eustace Wyatt (Caderousse), Paul Stewart (Paul Dantés) Sidney Smith (Mondego), Richard Wilson (the Officer), Virginia Welles (Mercédès); radio broadcast 29 August 1938
 1939: The Campbell Playhouse with Orson Welles (Dantés), Ray Collins (Caderousse), Everett Sloane (Abbé Faria), Frank Readick (Villefort), George Coulouris (Danglars), Edgar Barrier (Mondego), Richard Wilson (a Jailer), Agnes Moorehead (Mercédès); radio broadcast 1 October 1939
 1939: Robert Montgomery on the Lux Radio Theater (radio)
 1947–52: The Count of Monte Cristo radio program starring Carleton Young
 1960s: Paul Daneman for Tale Spinners For Children series (LP) UAC 11044
 1961: Louis Jourdan for Caedmon Records (LP)
 1964: Per Edström director (radio series in Sweden)
 1987: Andrew Sachs on BBC Radio 4 (later BBC Radio 7 and BBC Radio 4 Extra), adapted by Barry Campbell and directed by Graham Gould, with Alan Wheatley as L'Abbe Faria, Nigel Anthony as de Villefort, Geoffrey Matthews as Danglars and Melinda Walker as Mercedes
 1989: Richard Matthews for Penguin Random House
 2005: John Lee for Blackstone Audio
 2010: Bill Homewood for Naxos Audiobooks
 2012: Iain Glen on BBC Radio 4, adapted by Sebastian Baczkiewicz and directed by Jeremy Mortimer and Sasha Yevtushenko, with Richard Johnson as Faria, Jane Lapotaire as the aged Haydee, Toby Jones as Danglars, Zubin Varla as Fernand, Paul Rhys as Villefort and Josette Simon as Mercedes
 2017: The Count of Monte Cristo musical adaption by Berry & Butler
 2021: Radio Mirchi Kolkata's station aired The Count of Monte Cristo in Bengali, translated by Rajarshee Gupta for Mirchi's Sunday Suspense Programme. Edmond Dantès was voiced by actor Gaurav Chakrabarty. Abbé Faria was voiced by RJ Mir, Fernand Mondego by Anirban Bhattacharya and the story was narrated by RJ Deep. Apart from being a 6-hours epic, this adaptation was famous for having "Pitcairn Story" as the background music. This BGM is now being more identified with this epic.

Notes

References

Further reading

External links

 
 "Critical approach on The Count of Monte Cristo by Enrique Javier González Camacho in Gibralfaro, the journal of creative writing and humanities at the University of Malaga 
 
 "Tale Spinners for Children": The Count of Monte Cristo MP3 download
 Pierre Picaud: The "Real" Count 
 "Count of Monte Cristo Paris Walking Tour" identifies locations from the novel in Paris mapped on Google Maps
 
 The Count of Monte Cristo on BBC Radio 7
 The Count of Monte Cristo on Shmoop.com
 The Count of Monte Cristo on Project Gutenberg

 
1844 French novels
Novels by Alexandre Dumas
Epic novels
Fiction set in 1815
Fiction set in 1829
Fiction set in 1838
French adventure novels
French novels adapted into films
French novels adapted into plays
French novels adapted into television shows
Novels about revenge
Novels adapted into comics
Novels adapted into radio programs
Novels adapted into video games
Novels first published in serial form
Novels set during the Napoleonic Wars
Novels set in 19th-century France
Novels set in Italy
Novels set in prison
Novels set in the 1810s
Novels set in the 1820s
Novels set in the 1830s
Novels about pirates
Fiction about suicide
Treasure troves
Works originally published in Journal des débats